The City of Kalgoorlie–Boulder is a local government area in the Goldfields–Esperance region of Western Australia, about  east of the state capital, Perth. Its seat of government is the town of Kalgoorlie; all but 244 of the city's population live in either Kalgoorlie or Boulder.

History
This region has a long history of continuous inhabitation and cultivation by Aboriginal Australians.

In the years immediately after discovery of gold in the region, a variety of local government entities sprang up around the often-temporary settlements on the Kalgoorlie goldfields. Only three persisted beyond the early 20th century:

 The Municipality of Kalgoorlie was formed in 1895 and renamed the Town of Kalgoorlie in 1961.
 The Municipality of Boulder was formed in 1897. It became the Town of Boulder in 1961.
 The East Coolgardie Roads Board was formed in 1895. It renamed the Kalgoorlie Roads Board in 1897 and was made a shire as the Shire of Kalgoorlie in 1961.

The Town of Boulder was merged into the Shire of Kalgoorlie in July 1969, with the combined shire then being renamed the Shire of Boulder in November 1969. The Town of Kalgoorlie and the Shire of Boulder then amalgamated to form the City of Kalgoorlie–Boulder in 1989.

Other early local government areas in the region include:

 Municipality of Broad Arrow (1897–1903)
 Broad Arrow Road District (1899–1922)
 Municipality of Broad Arrow-Paddington (1903–1910)
 Municipality of Bulong (1896–1909)
 Bulong Road District (1899–1911)
 Municipality of Kanowna (1896–1917)
 North East Coolgardie Road District (1896–1922)
 Municipality of Paddington (1901–1903)

Roads in Kalgoorlie-Boulder
 Boulder Road
 Anzac Drive
 Gatacre Drive
 Picadilly Street
 Hannan Street
 Graeme Street
 Maritana Street
 Federal Road
 Croesus St

Major Roads in the region
 Goldfields Highway
 Great Eastern Highway

Origins of the City

Key dates
 1 July 1961 – Boulder and Kalgoorlie municipalities became towns, and Kalgoorlie Roads Board became a shire, following changes to the Local Government Act
 1 July 1969 – Town of Boulder was amalgamated into the Shire of Kalgoorlie, which was renamed Shire of Boulder.
 1 February 1989 – The Shire of Boulder and Town of Kalgoorlie amalgamated to form the City of Kalgoorlie–Boulder.

Wards
The City is not divided into wards and the twelve councillors sit at large. The mayor is elected by popular vote.

Towns, suburbs and localities
The towns, suburbs and localities of the City of Kalgoorlie-Boulder with population and size figures based on the most recent Australian census:

Notes

  For the purpose of the 2021 Australian census, Lakewood was counted as part of Feysville.

Ghost towns
Ghost towns within the City of Kalgoorlie-Boulder:

Heritage-listed places

As of 2023, 387 places are heritage-listed in the City of Kalgoorlie–Boulder, of which 62 are on the State Register of Heritage Places, among them the Kalgoorlie Railway Station , the York and Exchange Hotel and Boulder railway station.

References

External links
 City of Kalgoorlie–Boulder official website

Kalgoorlie-Boulder
Local government of Kalgoorlie-Boulder